Genest is a surname. Notable people with the surname include:

Charles-Borromée Genest (1832–1873), Canadian politician
Christian Genest (born 1957), Canadian statistician
Claude Genest, Canadian journalist, actor, and television host
Émile Genest (1921–2003), Canadian actor
Jacques Genest (born 1919), Canadian physician and scientist
John Genest (1764–1839), English clergyman and theatre historian
Rick Genest (August 7, 1985 – August 1, 2018), also known as "Zombie Boy", Canadian tattooee, model, and actor
Andre Genest, CPA (born July 29, 1992), Wealth Advisor, Professional Accountant, and actor

See also

Le Genest-Saint-Isle, Mayenne department, France

French-language surnames